In Greek mythology, Dike or Dice ( or ;) is the goddess of justice and the spirit of moral order and fair judgement as a transcendent universal ideal or based on immemorial custom, in the sense of socially enforced norms and conventional rules. According to Hesiod (Theogony, l. 901), she was fathered by Zeus upon his second consort, Themis. She and her mother are both personifications of justice. She is depicted as a young, slender woman carrying a balance scale and wearing a laurel wreath. The constellation Libra (the Scales) was anciently thought to represent her distinctive symbol. 

She is often associated with Astraea, the goddess of innocence and purity. Astraea is also one of her epithets, referring to her appearance in the nearby constellation Virgo which is said to represent Astraea. This reflects her symbolic association with Astraea, who, too, has a similar iconography.

Depiction
The sculptures of the Temple of Zeus at Olympia have as their unifying iconographical conception the dikē of Zeus, and in poetry she is often the attendant (paredros) of Zeus. In the philosophical climate of late 5th century Athens, dikē could be anthropomorphised as a goddess of moral justice. She was one of the three second-generation Horae, along with Eunomia ("order") and Eirene ("peace"):

She ruled over human justice, while her mother Themis ruled over divine justice. Her opposite was adikia ("injustice"); in reliefs on the archaic Chest of Cypselus preserved at Olympia, an attractive depiction Dikē throttled an ugly depiction of Adikia and beat her with a stick.

The later art of rhetoric treated the personification of abstract concepts as an artistic device, which devolved into the allegorizing that Late Antiquity bequeathed to patristic literature. In a further euhemerist interpretation, Dikē was born a mortal and Zeus placed her on Earth to keep mankind just. He quickly learned this was impossible and placed her next to him on Mount Olympus.

Dike Astraea
One of her epithets was Astraea, referring to her appearance as the constellation Virgo. According to Aratus's account of the constellation's origin, Dike lived upon Earth during the Golden and Silver ages, when there were no wars or diseases, men raised fine crops and did not yet know how to sail. They grew greedy, however, and Dike was sickened. She proclaimed:

Dike left Earth for the sky, from which, as the constellation, she watched the despicable human race. After her departure, the human race declined into the Bronze Age, when diseases arose and humanity learned how to sail.

In the Bible
The consensus of most biblical scholars is that the book of Acts contains a reference to Dike in its final chapter. In Acts 27, the Apostle Paul is conducted toward Rome under guard after having appealed his legal case to Caesar. After getting caught in a storm, having their boat ran aground, and narrowly escaped death making it to shore, they discovered they had landed on Malta and were cared for by the local populace. While helping to fuel the fire, Paul was bitten by snake, and the locals concluded, "No doubt this man is a murderer! Although he has escaped from the sea, Justice herself has not allowed him to live" (NET)! Ben Witherington III writes of this incident, 

It was common belief of the time that the sea was a place where the gods could exact vengeance, and the snakebite was likely perceived as Dike pursuing Paul after surviving the shipwreck.

See also
 Lady Justice

Notes

References 
 Athanassakis, Apostolos N., and Benjamin M. Wolkow, The Orphic Hymns, Johns Hopkins University Press, 2013. . Internet Archive. Google Books.
 Brill’s New Pauly: Encyclopaedia of the Ancient World. Antiquity, Volume 4, Cyr-Epy, editors: Hubert Cancik, Helmuth Schneider, Brill, 2004. . Online version at Brill
 Pausanias, Description of Greece, Volume II: Books 3-5 (Laconia, Messenia, Elis 1), translated by W. H. S. Jones, Loeb Classical Library No. 188, Cambridge, Massachusetts, Harvard University Press, 1926. . Online version at Harvard University Press. Online version at the Perseus Digital Library.
 Smith, William, Dictionary of Greek and Roman Biography and Mythology, London (1873). Online version at the Perseus Digital Library.

Children of Zeus
Greek goddesses
Horae
Justice goddesses
Personifications in Greek mythology